Punam Barla (born Feb 10, 1995) is a member of the India women's national field hockey team who plays as a forward for the team. Hailing from Odisha she made her International debut in 2015.

References

Living people
Munda people
Field hockey players from Odisha
Indian female field hockey players
Sportswomen from Odisha
21st-century Indian women
21st-century Indian people
1995 births
South Asian Games gold medalists for India
South Asian Games medalists in field hockey